A Rosenthal fiber is a thick, elongated, worm-like or "corkscrew" eosinophilic (pink) bundle that is found on staining of brain tissue in the presence of long-standing gliosis, occasional tumors, and some metabolic disorders.

Associated conditions
Its presence is associated with either pilocytic astrocytoma (more common) or Alexander's disease (a rare leukodystrophy). They are also seen in the context of fucosidosis.

Rosenthal fibres can also be seen in craniopharyngioma.

Composition
The fibers are found in astrocytic processes and are thought to be clumped intermediate filament proteins, primarily glial fibrillary acidic protein. Other reported constituents include alphaB crystallin, heat shock protein 27, protein beta-1), ubiquitin, vimentin, plectin, c-Jun, the 20 S proteasome, and synemin.

References

External links
 Neuropathology Mini-Course.  Chapter 9 - Tumors of the Nervous System
 Doctor's Doctor - Brain and Spinal Cord
 Isolation of a major protein component of Rosenthal fibers

Neuropathology